QZ Puppis (QZ Pup, b Pup) is a class B2.5V (blue main-sequence) star in the constellation Puppis. Its apparent magnitude is 4.5 and it is approximately 650 light years away based on parallax.

QZ Puppis was identified as a small-amplitude variable star in 1974, but the nature of the variability was unclear.  It was thought to be a spectroscopic binary on the basis of variability in the radial velocity of its spectral lines.  As a hot B-class main sequence star with variable spectral lines, it was suspected of being a β Cephei variable but this classification was repeatedly rejected.  The short-period sinusoidal variations in brightness with an amplitude of 0.03 magnitudes were interpreted as ellipsoidal variations as the star, distorted by a close companion, rotates with a period of 1.1 days.  Later analysis of Hipparcos photometry detected shallow eclipses.

The companion to QZ Puppis is only known from its effect on the visible star as they orbit.

References

Puppis
B-type main-sequence stars
Rotating ellipsoidal variables
Puppis, b
Puppis, QZ
CD-38 3769
038455
3084
064503
Spectroscopic binaries